Saul Penders (born 29 March 2003) is a Dutch professional footballer who plays as a midfielder for Eerste Divisie club MVV.

Career
Penders progressed through the MVV youth academy. He made his professional debut under head coach Klaas Wels on 22 October 2021, replacing Marko Kleinen in the 78th minute of a 3–0 away loss in the Eerste Divisie to NAC Breda. Penders made his first ever start on 29 January 2022 due to injuries and COVID-19 infections in the squad, featuring in midfield in a 1–0 league defeat away to FC Eindhoven.

On 7 July 2022, Penders signed his first professional contract with MVV, a two-year deal keeping him in Maastricht until 2024.

Personal life
Penders is the son of former MVV player and chief executive, Paul Penders.

Career statistics

References

External links
 

2003 births
Living people
Footballers from Maastricht
Dutch footballers
Association football midfielders
MVV Maastricht players
Eerste Divisie players